Criticisms of anti-scientific viewpoints are many and varied.

Most seem to focus on the confusion of conceptual metaphors arising in the process of learning science and negotiating acceptance of scientific truth in the larger culture. In Western education, for instance, students are encouraged to make systematic neutrally-based thinking central, as not taking sides in regard to cultural / ethical / religious traditions and conflicts between them. A common result is that other viewpoints tend to be ranked in comparison to the sciences, particularly the most experimentally-based sciences such as physics or chemistry: they are taken to be the model of neutral systematic reasoning. Mathematics and physics thus tend to be valued more highly as sources of insights into reality, than, say, music or religion. But many societies see those as sources of truth too, and have been skeptical of claims based on mathematics or the sciences — particularly since this mode of thought has been understood to be characteristic of the West and therefore to have something in common with such things as imperialism and colonialism. What is necessarily in common is rarely specified.

Recent philosophic manifestos by literary deconstructionists, radical feminists, and opponents of science generally (e.g., religious, cultural, political, etc.), have concentrated on what is claimed to be an unhealthy link between science and the humanities. The majority of these writers using the term scientism use it in a pejorative fashion, stressing the alleged unhealthy linkages or a claimed suppression by 'science' of other viewpoints. These writers typically view science as little more than a socially constructed ideology, neither having nor deserving any privileged position in comparison to others. In this view, scientists "bully" non-scientists with "oppressive" words such as logic, experiment, objectivity, etc.

Many people (and certainly many scientists) believe this type of criticism to be little more than an essentially anti-scientific 'science envy', having little to do with science itself and much more to do with cultural fears, political difficulties, and unfortunate social histories. Philosopher Susan Haack writes:

See also 
Antiscience
Panglossianism
Philosophy of science
Scientific method

References 

 Sandra Harding, "Who Knows? Identities and Feminist Epistemology," in Joan E. Hartman and Ellen Messer-Davidow, eds., (En)gendering Knowledge, University of Tennessee Press, Knoxville, 1991, p. 109

External links 
 Is Science Killing the soul? A discussion between Steven Pinker and Richard Dawkins 
 Richard Dawkins essay: Is Science a Religion?

Anti-Scientific Viewpoints